Boston Alliance Against Registration and the Draft (BAARD), was an anti-draft organization based in Cambridge, Massachusetts that operated between 1979 and 1990. BAARD was affiliated with the national Committee Against Registration and the Draft (CARD), which had been organized in response to President Jimmy Carter's 1979 call for draft registration.

BAARD organized movements to oppose draft registration. It similarly criticized what it described as militarization and foreign intervention. It organized actions at the Cambridge, Boston, Somerville and Watertown post offices, did media outreach, and created alliances with similar anti-draft groups, peace and legal groups. Anti-military counseling and CO counseling was also organized. BAARD opposed intervention in Central America. BAARD organized two draft registration counseling sessions with NISBCO and CCCO during the first Gulf War.

References
Boston Protesters Rally Against Draft (Harvard Crimson)
New England Yearly Meeting's Peace and Social Concerns Committee
Peace Action, Inc. Records, 1982-1989
The Tech (MIT)

Anti-conscription organizations
Organizations based in Cambridge, Massachusetts
1979 establishments in Massachusetts
1990 disestablishments in Massachusetts
Organizations established in 1979
Organizations established in 1990
Conscription in the United States